Culicia is a genus of corals belonging to the family Rhizangiidae.

The genus has almost cosmopolitan distribution.

Species

Species:

Culicia australiensis 
Culicia cuticulata

References

Rhizangiidae
Scleractinia genera